is a retired Japanese female butterfly swimmer. She represented Japan at the 1996 Summer Olympics in Atlanta, Georgia. She also won a silver medal at the 1997 FINA Short Course World Championships.

References
 Profile

1980 births
Living people
Japanese female butterfly swimmers
Olympic swimmers of Japan
Swimmers at the 1996 Summer Olympics
Medalists at the FINA World Swimming Championships (25 m)
Asian Games medalists in swimming
Asian Games bronze medalists for Japan

Medalists at the 1998 Asian Games
Swimmers at the 1998 Asian Games
20th-century Japanese women